Janko Ravnik (7 March 1891 – 2 September 1981) was a Slovenian pianist, teacher, film director and composer.

He was born in Bohinjska Bistrica and died in Ljubljana. In 1928 and 1929, he filmed In the Kingdom of the Goldhorn, the first Slovene feature film. It features the ascent of a group of students to the top of Mount Triglav. In 1929, Ravnik filmed a great national ceremony in Ljubljana on the 120th anniversary of the establishment of the Illyrian Provinces, during which a monument was erected to Napoleon and Illyria at French Revolution Square. One of his pupils was Pavel Šivic.

References

1891 births
1981 deaths
People from the Municipality of Bohinj
Slovenian film directors
Slovenian pianists
Slovenian composers
Male composers
20th-century composers
20th-century pianists
Slovenian male musicians